Phygela is a genus of bush crickets in the tribe Holochlorini, erected by Carl Stål in 1876, with species found in Malesia.

Species
The Orthoptera species file lists:
 Phygela haanii Stål, 1876 - type species
 Phygela latipennis Karny, 1931
 Phygela marginata Brunner von Wattenwyl, 1878

References

External links
 

Tettigoniidae genera
Phaneropterinae